Mark Johannes van der Laan is the Jiann-Ping Hsu/Karl E. Peace Professor of Biostatistics and Statistics at the University of California, Berkeley. He has made contributions to survival analysis, semiparametric statistics, multiple testing, and causal inference. He also developed the targeted maximum likelihood estimation methodology. He is a founding editor of the Journal of Causal Inference.

Education
He received his Ph.D. from Utrecht University in 1993 with a dissertation titled "Efficient and Inefficient Estimation in Semiparametric Models".

Career and research
He received the COPSS Presidents' Award in 2005, the Mortimer Spiegelman Award in 2004, and the van Dantzig Award in 2005.

Publications

References 

1967 births
Living people
Dutch statisticians
Utrecht University alumni
UC Berkeley School of Public Health faculty
Biostatisticians